In jurisprudence, procedural defenses are forms of defense challenging the legitimacy of the legal proceeding. A party argues that it should not be held liable for a legal charge or claim brought against them by some legal process, because it has been found such a process is illegitimate. Procedural defenses are built into legal systems as incentives for systems to follow their own rules. In common law jurisdictions the term has applications in both criminal law and civil law.  Procedural defenses do not settle questions of guilt or innocence in a criminal proceeding, and are independent of substantive findings for or against a plaintiff or defendant in a civil proceeding. As examples: Defendants might claim there is something about the method of bringing them to be judged, that is unable to result in justice done to someone in their situation. They might claim the process is incompatible with the goals of the justice system. 

In the United States, procedural defenses include: 
 collateral estoppel
 denial of a speedy trial
 double jeopardy
 entrapment
 prosecutorial misconduct
 selective prosecution
 exclusionary rule
 facts found by judge rather than jury
 denial or neglect of public counsel appointment
 no opportunity to impugn witnesses against you
 breaches of due process, such as precedent established in Rhode Island v. Innis (1980) or Miranda v. Arizona (1966)
 denial of a jury trial in a civil case
Traditional procedural defenses in "equity" in the U.S. and other common law jurisdictions:
 laches
 estoppel

See also
 legal technicality
 procedural justice

Criminal defenses